Amebix were an English crust punk band. Formed as the Band with No Name, the band's original run was from 1978 to 1987, during which time they released two EPs and three albums. The group reunited in 2008, released another full-length album in 2011, and disbanded again in November 2012.

By being one of the first bands to blend anarcho-punk and heavy metal music, Amebix are often cited as one of the key bands that helped to create the crust punk genre, and as being influential to many extreme metal bands, especially black metal bands.

History
Amebix were initially formed by Rob Miller (a.k.a. "The Baron") along with his brother "Stig" Chris Miller, Andy "Billy Jug", (Andy Hoare) and Clive Barnes whilst at school in Tavistock Devon in 1978. Initially referring to themselves as "The Band with No Name" the band played extensively around the local area, during which time they recorded a four track demo tape. Using his role as part-time columnist in a local paper Rob Miller gave a tape to Crass when they played in Plymouth. The track "University Challenged" from this demo was then featured on the first Crass Records Bullshit Detector compilation LP.

Clive B and drummer Andy "Billy Jug" left the band and Martin Baker became Amebix' new drummer. Baker's parents' manor house in Dartmoor was then used to practice in. It was around this time that the band began to refer to themselves as 'Amebix'. According to an interview with lead singer and bassist Rob Miller, Amebix refers to the amoeba. However, Baker was removed by his parents from the band and relocated to London where he had a breakdown and was diagnosed with paranoid schizophrenica. The song "Largactyl" was written about his experience.

The band then recruited Norm (Screaming Heads, Phantasmagoria, NormYard) as a synth player and relocated to Bristol, living in a number of squats. They recruited Disorder drummer Neil "Virus" Worthington (from Nailsea in Somerset) to play drums and finally had a semi-stable line-up. This line-up would record the first two 7"s (Who's the Enemy and Winter) and their first album No Sanctuary. A fill-in synth player would appear on No Sanctuary, and in 1984 they would acquire a new synth player, George. While recording No Sanctuary at Southern Studios they met Jello Biafra of American punk band Dead Kennedys and owner of the punk record label Alternative Tentacles. As a result, they became the label's first UK signing, and subsequently released the Arise! album in 1985. The final line-up would come together in 1985 with the addition of Spider on drums. They signed to Heavy Metal Records for the release of 1987's Monolith, whose release/distribution difficulties led to the band eventually splitting, although they were to continue touring, their final tour ending in Sarajevo before the collapse of Yugoslavia.   
 
Spider, George, and Stig went on to perform in Zygote. Vocalist Rob Miller now lives on the Isle of Skye where he works as a self-taught swordsmith.

According to The Baron's Myspace page, Amebix have reformed as of February 2008. On 9 March 2008, Amebix reissued their last album Monolith as a sliding scale download through Moshpit Tragedy Records. Since reforming, the band have released the Redux EP, which consists of three rerecorded songs from the band's original incarnation, plus a fourth live track on the downloadable version. A new maxi-single entitled Knights of the Black Sun was released on 3 June 2011 which also featured the band's first ever music video. Sonic Mass, the band's third album and first full-length in 24 years, was released on 23 September 2011 through the band's own label (Amebix Records) and Easy Action Records. They disbanded on 28 November 2012.

In 2014, Rob "The Baron" Miller joined forces with Jon Misery (Misery), Andy Lefton (War//Plague) and Michel "Away" Langevin of Voivod to form Tau Cross.

Influences
Amebix took inspiration from Motörhead (and to a lesser extent Lemmy-era Hawkwind), Black Sabbath, and combined with an ethos and worldview akin to Crass. They were also influenced by various post-punk and gothic rock bands, including Public Image Ltd, Bauhaus, Joy Division and especially Killing Joke. Many have claimed that Amebix were influenced by proto-black metal band Venom; however, Rob Miller has denied this on numerous occasions. Hellhammer, Bathory and Darkthrone have stated that they were hugely influenced by Amebix. Such notable bands as Sepultura, Neurosis and Deviated Instinct have paid homage to the band.

Members

Final line-up
Rob "The Baron" Miller – vocals (1978–1987; 2008–2012), bass (1979–1987; 2008–2012)
Chris "Stig" Miller – guitar, backing vocals (1978–1987; 2008–2012), keyboards (1978–1979)
Roy Mayorga – drums, percussion, keyboards (2008–2012)

Past members
Clive Barnes – bass (1978–1979)
Andy "Billy Jug" Hoare – drums (1978–1981)
Ric Gadsby – bass (1979)
Martin Baker – drums (1981)
Norman Butler – keyboards (1981–1984)
Virus – drums (1981–1985; died 2015)
Jenghiz – keyboards (1984)
George Fletcher – keyboards (1984–1986)
Robert "Spider" Richards – drums (1985–1987)

Timeline

Discography

Studio albums
No Sanctuary (1983, 12", Spiderleg Records)
Arise! (1985, LP/CD, Alternative Tentacles)
Monolith (1987, LP/CD, Heavy Metal Records)
Sonic Mass (2011, LP/CD, Easy Action & Amebix Records)

EPs
Who's the Enemy (1982, 7", Spiderleg Records)
Redux (2010, 12", CD, DD, Profane Existence)

Live albums
V živo (1986)

Compilation albums
The Power Remains (1993, LP, Skuld Releases)
No Sanctuary: The Spiderleg Recordings (2008, LP+7"/CD, Alternative Tentacles)
Bullshit Detector Vol 1: University Challenged (1980, LP, Crass Records, Bullshit Detector)

Singles
"Winter" (1983, 7", Spiderleg Records)
"Knights of the Black Sun" (2011)

Demos
Amebix (1979, self-released)
Right to Ride (1987, self-released)

References

External links
Archived version of their website
Amebix on bandcamp
Nightgaunt Graphics- Amebix official merch
One of the most extensive Amebix pages ever
Amebix Story
[ Amebix page on AllMusic]
Christian Miller Interview from DIY Conspiracy, 2021 - English
Christian Miller Interview from Ooer Fanzine 1988 - English
Rob "The Baron" Miller 2012 interview @ Metalfan.ro - English
Soundcheck 5 2011 interview - Rob "The Baron" Miller favorite albums
Rob "The Baron" Miller 2008 interview @ Metalfan.ro - English
Roy Mayorga 2008 interview @ Metalfan.ro - English

Alternative Tentacles artists
English heavy metal musical groups
British crust and d-beat groups
Political music groups
Musical groups established in 1978
Musical groups disestablished in 1987
Musical groups reestablished in 2008
Musical groups disestablished in 2012
1978 establishments in England